Vairumati is an 1897 oil on canvas painting by Paul Gauguin, now in the Musée d'Orsay in Paris.

References

Paintings by Paul Gauguin
Paintings in the collection of the Musée d'Orsay
1897 paintings
Birds in art